The 1978-79 Northern League season was the 13th season of the Northern League, the top level ice hockey league in northern England and Scotland. Seven teams participated in the league, and the Murrayfield Racers won the championship. The top four teams qualified for the Spring Cup, which served as the Northern League playoffs.

Regular season

Spring Cup

Semifinals
Whitley Warriors - Murrayfield Racers 2:0, 5:8
Billingham Bombers - Fife Flyers 9:6, 6:14

Final
Fife Flyers - Murrayfield Racers 1:2, 5:5

External links
 Season on hockeyarchives.info

Northern
Northern League (ice hockey, 1966–1982) seasons